Tadg Óg Ó hUiginn (born c.1370, died 1448) was an Irish poet.

Life and background
Ó hUiginn was a member of a well-known Irish family of bards, based in Connacht. His father, Tadhg Mór Ó hUiginn, died in 1391, while all that is known of his mother is her first name, Áine. He had an elder brother, Fearghal Ruadh Ó hUiginn, who succeeded his father as head of the family and died c.1400.  The historian of Medieval Gaelic Ireland, Marc Caball, believes him to have been a great-grandson of Tadhg Ó hUiginn, a celebrated poet who died in 1315.

Further personal details are few, but he did marry and have issue. His descendants included Maol Muire Ó hÚigínn who became an Archbishop of Tuam in 1586, and the poet Tadhg Dall Ó hUiginn (died c.1591). The Irish annals state that he kept a school for training in Irish bardic poetry with lodgings for scholars and pilgrims, and died at Kilconla in the barony of Dunmore, County Galway, in 1448. He was buried in the priory of Strade, now in County Mayo.

His school at Kilconla was still functioning in 1574, overseen by his descendant, Domhnall Ó hUiginn.

Poetic works

Ó hUiginn enjoyed a great professional reputation within his own lifetime, and was regarded as a master poet. His work enjoyed a wide range of appreciation, which apparent from the long list of prominent Gaelic-Irish and Anglo-Irish lords who were subjects of his work:

 O'Donnell of Tyrconnell
 O'Neill of Tyrone
 Butler of Ormond
 Burke of Clanricarde
 Mac William Bourke of Mayo
 O'Kelly of Ui Maine
 O'Carroll of Éile (Anglicised as Ely)
 MacDonnell of Islay
 MacDermot of Moylurg
 Maguire of Fermanagh
 O'Conor Sligo
 O'Conor Kerry

Upon the death of his brother in 1400, Tadg Óg composed a poem of lament for Fearghal Ruadh. Written in or around 1400, when Tadg Óg  was in his early thirties, it is entitled  (also known by the initial line of stanza 14).

Marc Caball draws attention to Ó hUiginn's success in "composing works of affective power and elegance ... nothwithstanding the somewhat formulaic configuration of the bardic form."

Devotional Christian poetry by Ó hUiginn's formed part of the Yellow Book of Lecan. Extracts of his verse were cited as models of poetic excellence in bardic school and tutorial tracts.

Selected works

 A-táid trí comhruig im chionn
 Cia do-ghéabhainn go Gráinne
 Dá bhrághaid uaim i nInis
 Foillsigh do mhíorbhuile, a Mhuire

See also
 Sean mac Fergail Óicc Ó hUiccinn, died 1490
 Philip Bocht Ó hUiginn
 Maol Sheachluinn na n-Uirsgéal Ó hUiginn
 Filí, the hereditary elite bardic poets of Gaelic Ireland
 Irish bardic poetry

Notes

References

External links
 
 
 
 
 
 

Medieval Irish poets
People from County Mayo
People from County Galway
Irish religious writers
15th-century Irish poets
1448 deaths
Irish male poets
Irish-language writers